Yang Jun (571 – 4 August 600), nickname Azhi, formally Prince Xiao of Qin, was an imperial prince of the Chinese Sui Dynasty. He was a son of Emperor Wen (Yang Jian) and his powerful wife Empress Dugu, who died as a result of an illness caused by poisoning by his jealous wife Princess Cui. His son Yang Hao was later briefly declared emperor by the general Yuwen Huaji after Yuwen killed his brother Emperor Yang in 618.

Family 
Parents
Father: Emperor Wen of Sui (隋文帝; 21 July 541 – 13 August 604)
Mother: Empress Wenxian, of the Henan Dugu clan (文獻皇后 河南獨孤氏; 544–602)
Consort and their respective issue(s):
Princess Consort Cui, of the Cui clan of Boling ( 崔妃博陵崔氏; d. 600）
Yang Hao, Prince of Qin (秦王 楊浩, d 23 October 618),  first son
Yang Zhan, Marquis of Jibei  (济北侯 杨湛; d. 618), second son
Concubine Chen, of the Chen clan, known as Princess Lingcheng (临成公主)
Unknown:
Princess Yongfeng (永丰公主), first daughter
Lady Yang, second daughter

Early life
Yang Jun was born in 571.  He was the third son of Yang Jian and Dugu Qieluo, after Yang Yong and Yang Guang.  When Yang Jian seized the throne from Emperor Jing of Northern Zhou in 581, ending Northern Zhou and establishing Sui Dynasty as its Emperor Wen, he created his sons princes, and Yang Jun was created the Prince of Qin.  In 582, Yang Jun, at age 11, was made the governor of Luo Province (洛州, roughly modern Luoyang, Henan) and titularly the commander of the armed forces east of the Hangu Pass. In 583, he was made the commandant at Qin Province (秦州, roughly modern Tianshui, Gansu) and was in charge of the surrounding provinces.  It was around this time that Yang Jun began to be a devout Buddhist and became known for his kindness, and at one point he requested permission from Emperor Wen to become a monk, a request that Emperor Wen denied.

Military and political career
In 586, Yang Jun became the regional executive of the provinces south of the Qinling Mountains and was stationed at Xiangyang (襄陽, in modern Xiangfan, Hubei).  It was around this time that his wife Princess Cui (the sister of the general Cui Hongdu gave birth to his first son Yang Hao.  In 588, when Emperor Wen launched a major attack against rival Chen Dynasty, Yang Jun was stationed at Hankou (漢口, in modern Wuhan, Hubei) and made the commander of the Sui forces in the middle Yangtze River region.  The Chen general Zhou Luohou soon arrived to guard against Yang Jun, but Yang Jun, disliking the idea of major battle losses, chose not to engage Zhou, and they stalemated.  Nevertheless, this stalemate prevented all Chen troops in the upper Yangtze region from being able to attend to the defense of the capital Jiankang, then attacked by forces under command of Yang Jun's brother Yang Guang.  Soon, when news arrived that Jiankang had fallen and the Chen emperor Chen Shubao had been captured, Zhou surrendered.  When Chen Shubao's brother Chen Shushen and cousin Chen Zhengli nevertheless tried to resist at Chen Shushen's post at Xiang Province (湘州, roughly modern Changsha, Hunan), the Sui generals Xue Zhou and Liu Ren'en attacked and captured Chen Shushen, delivering him to Yang Jun, and Yang Jun executed Chen Shushen.  Yang Jun submitted a report to Emperor Wen in which he stated, "It is unfortunately that I am even given the task of grinding grains, as I contributed nothing to the war effort, and am ashamed of it."  Emperor Wen, however, was pleased with his humility and, when Chen Shubao and his clan were presented to Emperor Wen, they were preceded into the palace by the victorious Yang Guang and Yang Jun.  Emperor Wen made Yang Jun the commandant at Yang Province (揚州, roughly modern Yangzhou, Jiangsu), in charge of 44 provinces, most of which was formerly Chen territory.  In 590, Emperor Wen swapped his assignment and Yang Guang's and made him the commandant at Bing Province (并州, roughly modern Taiyuan, Shanxi), in charge of 24 provinces.

Fall from grace
While at Bing Province, however, Yang Jun began to live luxuriously, including building palaces beyond what was proper for an imperial prince.  He also began to have many concubines, and his wife Princess Cui became jealous and could not tolerate what Yang Jun was doing.  In 597, she poisoned melons that Yang Jun was eating, and he became so ill that he had to be taken back to Chang'an for treatment.  It was then that his exceedingly wasteful living became known to Emperor Wen, who favored frugal lifestyles and was displeased with Yang Jun's wastefulness.  In fall 597, Emperor Wen removed Yang Jun from all of his posts and returned him to his mansion only with the title of imperial prince.  Soon thereafter, it was discovered that it was Princess Cui who poisoned Yang Jun, and Emperor Wen ordered a divorce between them, and then, after sending her back to her home, ordered her to commit suicide.  The generals Liu Sheng and Yang Su both believed that the punishment against Yang Jun was overly severe, but Emperor Wen responded to Yang Su:

Emperor Wen therefore did not permit Yang Jun to return to service.  Thereafter, Yang Jun's illness appeared to never get well, and by 600, he was extremely ill, and he sent messengers to deliver a petition to Emperor Wen, requesting forgiveness, but Emperor Wen refused.  Only when Yang Jun was near death did Emperor Wen confer on him the honorific post of Shang Zhuguo, an office that, in Sui's nine-rank system, was first rank, second class, but carried no authorities of its own.

Death and legacy
Yang Jun died in summer 600, and it was said that Emperor Wen only cried slightly before stopping.  He ordered the overly luxurious items that Yang Jun made to be all destroyed.  When Yang Jun's staff requested that a stone monument be erected for Yang Jun, Emperor Wen responded:

Yang Jun was survived by two sons—Yang Hao, the son of Princess Cui, and Yang Zhan, born of a concubine. The imperial officials, anticipating that Emperor Wen would not favor having either of them inherit Yang Jun's title, recommended that neither be allowed—on the basis that Yang Hao had been tainted by Princess Cui's crimes, and that Yang Zhan, as the son of a concubine, should not inherit. Emperor Wen agreed, and had Yang Jun's staff serve as his mourners. Yang Jun's oldest daughter Princess Yongfeng was 11 at this time, and she mourned Yang Jun in a particularly devout manner that she was praised by historians. It was not until Yang Guang became emperor in 604 that Yang Hao was allowed to inherit the title of Prince of Qin and Yang Zhan was created the Marquess of Jibei.

References

 Book of Sui, vol. 45.
 History of the Northern Dynasties, vol. 71.
 Zizhi Tongjian, vols. 175, 176, 177, 178, 179.

Sui dynasty generals
Sui dynasty imperial princes
571 births
600 deaths
Sui dynasty Buddhists
Political office-holders in Henan
Political office-holders in Gansu
Political office-holders in Hubei
Political office-holders in Jiangsu
Political office-holders in Shanxi